The Toronto City Hall, or New City Hall, is the seat of the municipal government of Toronto, Ontario, Canada, and one of the city's most distinctive landmarks. Designed by Viljo Revell and engineered by Hannskarl Bandel, the building opened in 1965. The building is located adjacent to Nathan Phillips Square, a public square at the northwest intersection of Bay Street and Queen Street, that was designed and officially opened alongside Toronto City Hall.

Toronto City Hall replaced the neighbouring Old City Hall, which was occupied by the municipal government since 1899 and continues to house municipal offices and courts. The building also served as the seat for the Metropolitan Toronto regional government from 1965 to 1992.

History
City leaders had been looking to build a more modern city hall to house its growing municipal government since at least 1943, when a report to city council recommended a new city hall and square in the block bounded by Queen Street West, Bay Street, and Chestnut Street. The recommendation was rejected by the electorate in a referendum on New Year's Day in 1947. However, in October 1952, a panel of citizens appointed by city council made the same recommendation. In 1954, leaders selected a partnership of three of Toronto's largest architectural firms: Marani and Morris, Mathers and Haldenby, and Shore and Moffat, to create a design. Presented in November 1955, their design proposed a conservative, symmetrical limestone-clad building in the Modernist style facing a landscaped square. Unlike the design that would ultimately be built, it retained the stone Beaux-Arts Registry Office on the western part of the site and also included a landscaped public space in front of it. The podium of the new city hall was to house the council chambers, and was given columns to complement the eight columns of the Registry Building, with which it was aligned across the new public space in front of it.

The scheme was panned by leading architects, including Frank Lloyd Wright (who called it a "sterilization" and "a cliché already dated") and Walter Gropius (who deemed it a "very poor pseudo-modern design unworthy of the city of Toronto"), and all classes of the University of Toronto Faculty of Architecture co-authored a letter condemning the proposal and calling for an international competition. The whole $18 million proposal was scrapped when voters rejected it in a December 1955 referendum. The parti was adapted by the architects and built as the Imperial Oil Building on St. Clair Avenue West.

Design competition
Led by Mayor Nathan Phillips, the Toronto city council decided in 1956 to hold an international competition to choose the new design under terms created by the International Union of Architects.  This caused some controversy as some felt the work should be done by a Canadian. Phillips assembled a five-person panel of judges from some of the world's greatest architecture experts with Eric Arthur serving as advisor.

By the deadline of April 18, 1958, the committee received over 500 designs from 42 countries from which it selected eight semi-finalists. In September 1958, three judges selected Viljo Revell's design, though it almost missed the short list. Eero Saarinen, as member of the panel of five judges, arrived a day and half late and chose Revell's design from the other judges' list of entrants that could summarily be rejected. He convinced two other judges on the panel that Revell's unique design should be the winner. One of the two dissenting judges was William Graham Holford, who was skeptical that the design could be built within the $18 million budget set by the city. Revell received a $25,000 prize plus an estimated $1 million in fees to supervise construction. He complained that not enough credit was given to his design collaborators, Heikki Castren, Bengt Lundsten, and Seppo Valjus, and asked that all names be listed as the architects. Revell died in 1964 before the project was finished.

Construction

Construction began in 1961, and the building was completed four years later. The time capsule for City Hall was placed in a large ceremony on November 7, 1962 and Governor General Georges Vanier officially opened the new structure September 13, 1965.

The area of Toronto City Hall and the civic square was formerly the location of Toronto's first Chinatown, which was expropriated and bulldozed during the mid-1950s in preparation for a new civic building. The location of City Hall itself was also the site of the 1917 Land Registry Office. It was designed in the Roman Classical style and was itself intended as part of a prior urban renewal plan for the area. It was demolished in 1964.

The south side of Queen Street opposite City Hall was considered a 'commercial slum' and in August 1964, Toronto City Council voted to expropriate the south side for development appropriate to the new civic square. The businesses on that side of the street included two burlesque theatres, pawn shops and a cinema. The south side was vacant at the time of the City Hall opening but was eventually occupied by a new hotel, connected by a bridge over Queen Street to the square.

To the west of the new City Hall, the University Avenue Armouries at University Avenue just north of Osgoode Hall was bought from the Government of Canada for  million to make way for a new court building, also as part of the new civic square project.

Opening and post-completion changes

The building was officially opened to the public on September 13, 1965, by Georges Vanier, the governor general of Canada. The opening ceremony was attended by 14,000 dignitaries, including Lester B. Pearson, the prime minister of Canada, and John Robarts, the premier of Ontario.

In 1990, Hester How Daycare Centre was opened in the building, and named after a Toronto teacher Hester How, who helped turn around delinquent boys in the second half of the 19th Century. 

City Hall was designated as a property of historical and architectural significance under the Ontario Heritage Act in 1991.

Minor upgrades by Toronto architect Bruce Kuwabara to connect the two towers and upgrade council chambers from 1997 to 1998. A green roof was added late 2009 and opened to over 10,000 visitors on Doors Open Toronto weekend in May 2010.  The site now contains largest publicly accessible green roof in the city.

Design and features

Exterior
While the building's base is rectangular, its two towers are curved in cross-section and rise to differing heights.
The east tower is 27 storeys tall and the west tower is 20 storeys. Between the towers is the saucer-like council chamber, and the overall arrangement is somewhat like two hands cradling the chamber. The outer surfaces of the curve are covered with concrete bearing a rib pattern that provides strength and prevents collapse of the fabric as a result of the expansion of the exterior surfaces, and the tearing apart of the fabric as a result of differences in air pressure on the two sides of each wing-like tower during the high winds characteristic of the Great Lakes. The north, west, and east elevations are more abstract and sculptural in contrast with the extensive glazing of south elevation facing the square; each presents a view of concave panels of concrete textured with split-faced strips of Botticino marble. To the east of the square is Old City Hall which currently serves as a courthouse. 

From the air, the building is seen as a giant unblinking eye, thus the building's original nickname of "The Eye of Government". When finished, the building generated widespread controversy among many who felt that it was "too futuristic" for the city. In Arthur's 1964 book, Toronto, No Mean City, he praised the new City Hall, writing: "Taller buildings will be built before the end of the century here and elsewhere in North America, but there will be no comparable or no more renowned city hall."

Interior

The building also includes observation decks. The East Tower Observation on the 27th floor is closed to the public, although access to the observation deck, and other areas in the building complex, have been provided during the annual Doors Open Toronto event. Access to the floor is via two sets of stairs as elevators end at 25th floor. 

The building also includes a branch of the Toronto Public Library, although it has been reduced in size since its opening.

Council Chambers
The City Council chambers is a semi-circular room located on the second floor supported on a single massive column below. On the main level of the chambers are the seats for the 25 members of Council, arranged in a semi-circle.

In front of the councillors is the podium and seat for the Speaker of Toronto City Council (or Deputy Speaker when Speaker is not present). Flanking the Speaker are two long tables for Commissioners (i.e., department heads); City Manager, Deputy City Manager, City Solicitor and Chief Financial Officer are seated to the right and City Staff on the left. In front of the Speaker is the horseshoe shaped desk for the City Clerk and Clerk staff. The mayor, is seated amongst councillors in the first row to the Speaker's right. A removable podium is located to the right of the Speaker for guest speakers.  The room is covered by a shallow dome resting on 23 pairs of v-shaped supports that rise from the base.  The space behind the supports is filled with glass.

Behind the councillors is the public seating gallery which accommodates 250 in tiered rows.  Adjacent to City Council chambers are two committee rooms, as well as the offices of the mayor and city councillors. Two sets of elevators provide access to the floors below (ground floor and to the parking garage below).

Public square

The design for the public space in front of the new city hall, Nathan Phillips Square, was part of the competition. The square's reflecting pool and concrete arches, fountain, and overhead walkways were thus also part of Revell's submission. It has since seen several monuments, sculptures, and other works of public art added, and was renovated, but it continues to complement the city hall with its original Modernist design elements. 

The public square is one of the main hosts of different festivals and events in Toronto. New Year's celebrations are held there every year which include fireworks and  musical performances. The annual Cavalcade of Lights Festival decorates the square from the end of November until the end of December.

In popular culture
Even as early as 1969, the building appeared as a futuristic alien building in a Star Trek comic; it was later seen in the Star Trek: The Next Generation episode "Contagion" (Season 2, episode 11, March 20, 1989) as one of the possible destinations of an alien portal.

The 2010 film Red featured Toronto City Hall and various other city locations.

See also

 Metro Hall
 East York Civic Centre
 Etobicoke Civic Centre
 North York Civic Centre
 Scarborough Civic Centre
 York Civic Centre

References

Notes

Sources

External links

 City of Toronto's history page
 Historical photos: Viljo Revell, the design competition, construction, and opening
 Emporis database listing
 Open Buildings:Toronto City Hall profile
 Contemporary photo gallery
 A grand design: Toronto City Hall and Square competition - submissions from architects for the 1958 design competition

1965 establishments in Ontario
City and town halls in Ontario
Government buildings completed in 1965
Modernist architecture in Canada
Municipal buildings in Toronto
PATH (Toronto)